This is a list of notable Welsh Americans, including both original immigrants who obtained American citizenship and their American descendants.

To be included in this list, the person must have a Wikipedia article showing they are Welsh American or must have references showing they are Welsh American and are notable.

List

Fine art
Earl W. Bascom (1906–1995), western artist, sculptor, and inventor; "cowboy of cowboy artists"; "father of modern rodeo"

Entertainment
Cadre Thawk, glowing Welsh ancestry
Jessica Alba (born 1981), movie actress, distant Welsh ancestry
Alexis Arquette (1969–2016), movie actress, distant Welsh ancestry
David Arquette (born 1971), movie actor and TV director, distant Welsh ancestry
Patricia Arquette (born 1968), movie and TV actress, distant Welsh ancestry
Rosanna Arquette (born 1959), movie actress, distant Welsh ancestry
Michael Aston (born 1964), born in Cornelly, musician
Andrea Bowen (born 1990), actor
Dean Cain (born 1966), actor, mother is of partial Welsh ancestry
Erika Christensen (born 1982), actress, distant Welsh ancestry
Kelly Clarkson (born 1982), singer, distant Welsh ancestry
Miley Cyrus (born 1992), singer and actress
Bette Davis (1908–1989), two-time Academy Award-winning actress of stage, screen and television; distant Welsh ancestry
Billy De Wolfe (1907–1974), actor, mother was Welsh
Thomas Dekker (born 1987), actor, mother is Welsh
Michael Douglas (born 1944), actor, distant Welsh ancestry
Leslie Easterbrook (born 1949), actress, distant Welsh ancestry
Bill Evans (born 1929), jazz pianist / composer
Chris Evans (born 1981), actor, Welsh paternal great-great grandfather 
Sara Evans (born 1971), country music singer
Alice Eve (born 1982), actress
Glenn Ford (1916–2006), film actor
Carson Grant (born 1950), actor
D. W. Griffith (1875–1948), early film director
Teri Hatcher (born 1964), actress and writer, distant Welsh ancestry
Sitara Hewitt (born 1981), actress
Bob Hope (1903–2003), actor/comedian, mother was Welsh
Anthony Hopkins (born 1937), born in Port Talbot, Glamorgan; Academy Award-winning film/stage actor
John Houseman (1902–1988), film producer
Anjelica Huston (born 1951), actress, distant Welsh ancestry
John Huston (1906–1987), film director, screenwriter and actor, distant Welsh ancestry
Caitlyn Jenner, transgender television personality and athlete 
Kendall Jenner, socialite
Kylie Jenner, socialite and billionaire from her makeup Kylie Cosmetics
Quincy Jones (born 1933), record producer, conductor, arranger, film composer, television producer, and trumpeter, Welsh paternal grandfather  
Rashida Jones (born 1976), actress, Welsh paternal great-grandfather 
Jon Langford (born 1957), musician and artist
Tommy Lee (born 1963), drummer for hard rock/heavy metal band Mötley Crüe
Zachary Levi (born 1980), actor, distant Welsh ancestry
Ted Levine (born 1957), actor, mother was part Welsh
Blake Lewis (born 1981), American Idol contestant and singer 
Juliette Lewis (born 1973), actress and singer
Harold Lloyd (1893–1971), actor
Myrna Loy (1905–1993), actress
Marco Marenghi, animator, born in Rhondda
Kelly McGillis (born 1957), actress, distant Welsh ancestry
Ray Milland (1905–1986), actor
Wayne Newton (born 1942), distant Welsh ancestry
Leslie Nielsen (1926–2010), actor, Welsh mother 
Ninja (Tyler Blevins) (born 1991), Twitch streamer, distant Welsh ancestry
The Osmonds, including Donny Osmond (born 1957), half of the brother-sister singing act Donny & Marie; of part Welsh descent, traced their ancestry back to Merthyr Tydfil
Karyn Parsons (born 1966), actress, Fresh Prince of Bel Air, Welsh descent on father's side
Michelle Pfeiffer (born 1958), actress, distant Welsh ancestry
Brian Pillman (1962–1997), professional wrestler, mother was Welsh
Chris Pine (born 1980), actor, distant Welsh ancestry
Shawn Pyfrom (born 1986), actor, paternal grandfather is of Welsh ancestry
Kim Richards (born 1964), actress, distant Welsh ancestry
Kyle Richards (born 1969), actress, distant Welsh ancestry
Monica Richards, author and musician
Catherine Zeta-Jones (born 1969), born in Swansea, Glamorgan; actress
Katherine Jenkins (born 1980), born in Neath, Glamorgan; singer
Jason Robards (1922–2000), actor, distant Welsh ancestry
Eric Roberts (born 1956), actor, distant Welsh ancestry
Julia Roberts (born 1967), actress, distant Welsh ancestry
Coco Rocha (born 1988), Canadian model of Welsh, Irish, and Russian descent
Gena Rowlands (born 1930), actress, father was of Welsh descent
Susan Sarandon (born 1946), Oscar-winning actress, distant Welsh ancestry
Brooke Shields (born 1965), actress and model, distant Welsh ancestry
Esperanza Spalding (born 1984), singer/songwriter, distant Welsh ancestry
Tiffani Thiessen (born 1974), actress, distant Welsh ancestry
Henry Thomas (born 1971), actor, distant Welsh ancestry
Lynda Thomas (born 1981), musician, singer-songwriter
Scott Walker (born 1943), singer, distant Welsh ancestry
Tuc Watkins (born 1966), actor
Betty White (born 1922), actress, distant Welsh ancestry
Michelle Williams (born 1980), actress, distant Welsh ancestry
Robin Williams (1951–2014), actor, distant Welsh ancestry
Cassandra Wilson (born 1955), née Cassandra Fowlkes, jazz vocalist; distant Welsh ancestry through her father
Patrick Wilson (born 1973), actor, distant Welsh ancestry

Literature
Grover Jones (1893–1940), playwright, screenwriter
Sinclair Lewis (1885–1951), novelist/playwright
Jack London (1876–1916), author
Edgar Lee Masters (1868–1950), poet/biographer/dramatist
Lorin Morgan-Richards (born 1975), author and illustrator
Ogden Nash (1902–1971), poet, humorist

Politics
John Adams (1735–1826), President of the United States, Vice President of the United States
John Quincy Adams (1767–1848), President of the United States, Secretary of State
John Henry Bowen (1780–1822), U.S. Representative from Tennessee
Martha Hughes Cannon (1857–1932), physician, Utah women's rights advocate and suffragist, first female state senator elected in the United States, member of the Utah Senate from the 6th district (1897–1901)
Dick Cheney (born 1941), Vice President of the United States (2001–2009)
Cassius Marcellus Clay (1810–1903), abolitionist
Hillary Clinton (born 1947), Secretary of State, U.S. Senator from New York, former First Lady
James S. Conway (1796–1855), Governor of Arkansas (1836–1840)
Calvin Coolidge (1872–1933), President of the United States, Vice President of the United States
John J. Crittenden (1787–1863), Governor of Kentucky
James J. Davis (1873–1947), Secretary of Labor and U.S. Senator from Pennsylvania
Jefferson Davis (1808–1889), President of the Confederate States (1862–1865)
Alvin Evans (1845–1906), U.S. Representative from Pennsylvania; United States Senator from Iowa
John Floyd (1783–1837), Governor of Virginia
John B. Floyd (1806–1863), Governor of Virginia
William Floyd (1734–1821), United States Declaration of Independence signatory
James Garfield (1831–1881), President of the United States
Nicholas Gilman (1755–1814), United States Senator from New Hampshire
Button Gwinnett (1735–1777), United States Declaration of Independence signatory
Benjamin Harrison (1833–1901), President of the United States
 William Henry Harrison (1773–1841), President of the United States
Charles Evans Hughes (1862–1948), Chief Justice of the United States, Governor of New York
Andrew Humphreys (1821–1904), U.S. Representative from Indiana
Andrew A. Humphreys (1810–1883), United States Army officer and Union General in the American Civil War
E. Howard Hunt (1918–2007), CIA Intelligence Officer; a key figure in organizing and participating in the Watergate burglaries
Arthur James (1883–1973), Governor of Pennsylvania
Thomas Jefferson (1743–1826), President of the United States; Vice President of the United States
Robert E. Lee (1807–1870), Confederate general
Francis Lewis (1713–1802), United States Declaration of Independence signatory
Abraham Lincoln (1809–1865), President of the United States
James Madison (1751–1836), President of the United States
John Marshall (1755–1835), statesman, Chief Justice of the United States
George Mathews (1739–1812), Governor of Georgia
Henry M. Mathews (1834–1884), Governor of West Virginia
John G. McCullough (1835–1915), Governor of Vermont
James Monroe (1758–1831), President of the United States
James Morgan (1756–1822), United States Congressman from New Jersey
Lewis Morris (1726–1798), United States Declaration of Independence signatory
Robert Morris (1734–1806), United States Declaration of Independence signatory
Patty Murray (born 1950), United States Senator from Washington
Richard Nixon (1913–1994), President of the United States; Vice President of the United States
Barack Obama (born 1961), President of the United States
P.B.S. Pinchback (1837–1921), Governor of Louisiana
Hugh H. Price (1859–1904), U.S. Representative from Wisconsin
Rodman M. Price (1816–1894), Governor of New Jersey
John H. Pugh (1827–1905), U.S. Representative from New Jersey
Thomas Rees (1925–2003), U.S. Congressman, parents/grandparents from Wales
Ann Romney (born 1949), wife of American businessman and politician Mitt Romney
Theodore Roosevelt (1858–1919), President of the United States; Vice President of the United States
Isaac Shelby (1750–1826), Governor of Kentucky
Daniel Webster (1782–1852), United States Senator and Secretary of State
Thomas Wynne (1627–1691), physician to William Penn; speaker of the first Pennsylvania Provincial Assembly

Industry and business

Thomas Henry Blythe (1822–1883), born in Wales, immigrated to San Francisco, best known for using the Colorado River to irrigate large areas of the California and Mexican deserts
Jasper Newton "Jack" Daniel (1849–1911), Tennessee-born founder of Jack Daniel's whiskey
Bob Evans (1918–2007), founder of Bob Evans Restaurants
William Fargo (1818–1881), pioneer expressman
Howard Hughes (1905–1976), pioneering aviator, engineer, industrialist, and film producer
Willard F. Jones (1890–1967), naval architect, Gulf Oil executive
Reese J. Llewellyn (1862–1936), born in Brynamman, Wales, immigrated to San Francisco, later settling in Los Angeles, co-founder and president of Llewellyn Iron Works
J. P. Morgan (1837–1913), banker
Junius Spencer Morgan (1813–1890), banker
Jonathan I. Schwartz (born 1965), president and chief executive officer of CareZone
Howard Stringer (born 1942), businessman and chief executive officer of Sony Corporation
Lloyd Tevis (1824–1899), banker
David Thomas (1794–1882), prominent ironmaster and philanthropist during the Industrial Revolution in Pennsylvania

Other
Mervyn S. Bennion (1887–1941), Congressional Medal of Honor recipient killed during the Attack on Pearl Harbor; grandfather was a Welsh immigrant
James Bowie (1796–1836), pioneer and Texas revolutionary
Daniel Boone (1734–1820), American pioneer
 Mary Katherine Campbell (1905–1990), Miss America titleholder 1922 and 1923, first runner-up 1924 
Jeffrey Lionel Dahmer, serial killer; father has Welsh ancestry
Hiram Wesley Evans (1881–1966), Imperial Wizard of the "second" Ku Klux Klan, 1922–1939
Lewis Evans (1700–1756), colonial surveyor and geographer
Cowboy Morgan Evans (1903–1969), Texas rancher; 1928 World Series Rodeo Bulldogging champion; competition bull rider; oil production roughneck; drilling foreman; oilman
Oliver Evans (1755–1819), inventor
Murray Humphreys (1899–1965), Chicago mobster, chief political and labor racketeer in the Chicago Outfit during Prohibition
Frank James (1843–1915), cowboy/outlaw
Jesse James (1847–1882), cowboy/outlaw
George Jones (1811–1891), New-York Daily Times co-founder
John L. Lewis (1880–1969), organized labor union leader
Meriwether Lewis (1774–1809), explorer
Chelsea Manning (born 1987), mother was Welsh
Nate Marquardt (born 1979), MMA fighter, partially Welsh on his mother's side
Daniel Morgan (1736–1802), Brigadier General in the American Revolution in the Continental Army; served in the United States House of Representatives, representing Virginia
Michael Phelps (born 1985), Olympian swimmer, distant Welsh ancestry
William Farrand Prosser (1834–1911), Union Colonel in the American Civil War; served in the United States House of Representatives, representing Tennessee
Herbert M. Sauro (1960-), Scientist (UW, Seattle), born in Dyfed
Henry Morton Stanley (1841–1904), journalist/explorer
George Henry Thomas (1816–1870), Union General during the American Civil War 
Joe Watts (born 1942), gangster and associate of the Gambino crime family; partially Welsh on his father's side
Frank Lloyd Wright (1867–1959), one of the most prominent and influential architects of the first half of the 20th century
Elihu Yale (1649–1721), first benefactor of Yale University

References

+
Lists of American people by ethnic or national origin
Welsh
Americans